Daniel Robin Layus (born September 10, 1983) is an American musician. He was the vocalist, pianist, and primary lyricist for the band Augustana and performs solo both under his own name as well as Augustana. On October 21, 2016, he debuted his first solo work, an album titled Dangerous Things.

Early life
Layus was born in Southern California. In 2002 at Greenville College in Illinois, Dan Layus brought friends Josiah Rosen, Kyle Baker, and Simeon Lohrmann together to write and create music.

Career

Augustana (2002–2005)

Augustana began by re-recording the song "More than a Love Song", a song which Dan had written for his high school girlfriend while living in California. In 2003, when Layus was 19, Augustana released their debut album, Midwest Skies and Sleepless Mondays. Later that year, the band recorded and released 25 copies of the Mayfield EP.

Dan Layus decided to move back to Southern California with bandmate Josiah Rosen, where they eventually found their drummer, Justin South.  The band joined numerous tours with artists such as Switchfoot, Maroon 5, The Fray, Counting Crows, Dashboard Confessional, O.A.R., Snow Patrol, The Damnwells, Goo Goo Dolls, Acceptance, Cartel, and OneRepublic, as well as having their own headlining tours.

The band released the EP, All the Stars and Boulevards, on September 6, 2005 Josiah Rosen left the band soon after. He was replaced by Chris Sachtleben, while keyboardist Dan Lamoureux was added (and later replaced by John Vincent).

Augustana (2006–2010)
At the beginning of 2007, the band embarked on their second headlining tour, supported by Vega4. The band also opened for Chris Carrabba of Dashboard Confessional in late 2007.

The band released their second album, Can't Love, Can't Hurt, on April 29, 2008. Citing personnel problems, the band had to cancel their European/North American tour for fall 2010.

Augustana (2011–2013)
Augustana's self-titled, fourth full-length album was released on April 26, 2011.

Augustana parted ways with Epic Records shortly after the album's release and on November 11, 2011, Dan Layus announced that all remaining members had amicably parted ways when bassist, Jared Palomar, guitarist, Chris Sachtleben, drummer, Justin South, and keyboardist, John Vincent, decided that they were finished with Augustana. Layus announced that he would continue to tour and perform under the name Augustana. On July 22, 2013, Layus announced that Augustana was signed to a new record deal.

Augustana (2014–2016)
In early 2014, Layus announced that the band had signed with Razor & Tie, reforming the band with new members and touring as Augustana. He also premiered the first single, "Ash and Ember". On April 22, 2014, under the name 'Augustana', Layus released the album, Life Imitating Life, on which he played all of the instruments. He also premiered the first single, "Ash and Ember".

In summer of 2015, Layus opened for One Direction. On September 2, 2015, Augustana released three new tracks ("Climb", "Must Be Love" and "You Can Have Mine") on an EP titled "Side A".

In 2016, Augustana began touring as an opener for the Dixie Chicks on their DCX MMXVI World Tour.

On August 3, 2016, Augustana's social media sites changed their names to Dan Layus, as he was the sole remaining and founding member, as well as lead singer-songwriter.

Solo work (2016–2019)
After Augustana broke up, Layus transitioned into an Americana artist and fully embarked on a solo career. Layus and his family relocated from Los Angeles to Nashville in 2013. Layus began composing professionally three days a week, nine to five, for Nashville publishing house, Warner-Chappell Music, where he befriended, then began writing with, young Music Row talents like Maren Morris.

Layus released the album, Dangerous Things, on October 21, 2016. "Dangerous Things", which was released with Plated Records, was met with enthusiastic reviews. Rolling Stone magazine called Layus "one of Americana's most articulate newcomers." The album was recorded at South by Sea Studios in Nashville. Layus used a minimalist production style of fiddle, pedal steel, acoustic guitar, and piano. The sibling duo, the Secret Sisters, provided background vocals on a number of tracks.

Layus drew inspiration for the song "Driveway" from the real life experience of a friend when he observed his buddy sitting alone in his truck in the driveway as he was going through a divorce. When he was writing the song and was unable to finish the idea he played it for his wife. Though not a songwriter, she threw in some words and helped Layus to finish the track.

Layus has played the Grand Ole Opry twice both at the Ryman Auditorium in downtown Nashville and the Grand Ole Opry House. His Opry debut was at Opryland. He shared the bill with the veteran country singer, Connie Smith. He performed at the Ryman during a special Opry New Year's Eve show with the Americana band, Old Crow Medicine Show.

In 2017, Layus toured with LeAnn Rimes during her "Remnants" Tour.

In 2018, Layus began touring again under the name Augustana.

In 2019, Layus co-wrote the third track on the album The Highwomen, which is the debut studio album by country music supergroup the Highwomen. The group is made up of band members Brandi Carlile, Natalie Hemby, Maren Morris, and Amanda Shires. The album and track were released on September 6, 2019, by Elektra Records. Layus co-wrote the song with band member, Maren Morris, and songwriter, Maggie Chapman.

Augustana (2019)
On August 28, 2019, as Augustana, Layus released the song "For Now, Forever" was released as a single with "The Heart of It" as its B-side. He has stated that the songs were inspired by watching classic '80s movies for the first time, such as, The Karate Kid, Dirty Dancing, and Footloose.

Layus began a headlining Fall 2019 Tour as Augustana on August 24 with musician, Zac Clark, opening. He also opened for band, Daughtry, at eight shows.

Personal life
Layus married his longtime girlfriend, Nina, on January 18, 2008. They met and began dating prior to the release of his first record with Augustana when they moved in together. They have four children, Eloise, Townes, Mary, and Prudence Jane, who was born December 15, 2017. They reside in Franklin, Tennessee.

Layus has been sober since 2011.

Discography

Studio albums

Singles

Credits

As lead artist

References

External links
Dan Layus's official website

1983 births
21st-century American singers
Living people
American male singer-songwriters
American rock pianists
American male pianists
American rock singers
American rock songwriters
Singer-songwriters from California
Singer-songwriters from Illinois
People from San Diego
People from California
21st-century American pianists
21st-century American male singers